James Sharp, or Sharpe, (4 May 1618 – 3 May 1679) was a minister in the Church of Scotland, or kirk, who served as Archbishop of St Andrews from 1661 to 1679. His support for Episcopalianism, or governance by bishops, brought him into conflict with elements of the kirk who advocated Presbyterianism. Twice the victim of assassination attempts, the second cost him his life.

Biography
James Sharp was born at Banff Castle on 4 May 1618, eldest son of William Sharp (1592–1638) and Isabel Leslie (1595-ca 1640). His father was property manager, or factor, for the Earl of Findlater; his mother was the daughter of the Laird of Kininvie. His younger brother, Sir William Sharp of Stonihill (1622–1685), was political agent to the Duke of Lauderdale, Scottish Secretary of State from 1661 to 1680.

In April 1653, Sharp married Helen Moncrieff, daughter of the laird of Randerston. They had seven children.

Background
Whilst Presbyterian or Episcopalian now implies differences in both governance and doctrine, this was not the case in the 17th century. 'Episcopalian' meant governance by bishops, usually appointed by the monarch; Presbyterian implied rule by Elders, nominated by their congregations. The Protestant Reformation created a Church of Scotland, or 'kirk', that was Presbyterian in structure and Calvinist in doctrine. When bishops were introduced to the Scottish system in 1584, they were doctrinal Calvinists, who opposed many practices of the Church of England; these differences explain the failure of attempts to unify the two churches.

The 1638 National Covenant expelled bishops and established a Covenanter government, which ruled Scotland during the 1638 to 1651 Wars of the Three Kingdoms. In 1647, Royalist defeat in the First English Civil War split the Covenanters into moderate Engagers and Kirk Party fundamentalists; both sides believed the institution of monarchy was divinely ordered, but differed over who held ultimate authority in clerical affairs.

Attempts by the Scots to restore first Charles I, then his son Charles II to the English throne, ended with incorporation into the Commonwealth of England, Scotland and Ireland in 1652. The kirk split again, between a moderate majority known as Resolutioners, and 'Protestors', who blamed defeat on compromise with 'malignants.' Differences between the two were both religious and political, including church government, religious toleration and the role of law in a 'godly' society.

Since each split ended with the winners evicting the losers from their offices and ministries, it led to increasing bitterness. Lord Broghill, head of the Council of State for Scotland, summarised the position by saying 'the Resolutioners love Charles Stuart and hate us, the Protesters love neither him nor us.' He fostered conflict between the two groups as deliberate policy.

Career
Sharp was educated at the local grammar school and in 1637, graduated from King's College, Aberdeen. The university and Banff in general were centres of Episcopalian support and one of the few areas to oppose the 1638 National Covenant, which removed bishops from the kirk. 

Sharp went to Oxford, allegedly seeking a position in the Church of England, but returned to Scotland and by 1642, was a regent at the University of St Andrews. In 1648, he became minister for the parish of Crail, then a delegate to the kirk's General Assembly in 1650. He accompanied the Scottish army in its invasion of England and was captured at Worcester in September 1651, before being released in 1652.

The Protesters sent a delegation to argue their case before Parliament in 1656; Sharp was selected to represent the Resolutioners and spent most of the next four years in London. By 1659, plans were being made by George Monck to restore Charles II to the thrones of England and Scotland. The Resolutioners wanted Charles to commit to a Presbyterian kirk; in May 1660, Sharp was sent to Breda to ensure he did so, but was unsuccessful in getting a response.

In January 1661, Sharp was appointed Royal Chaplain, and returned to St Andrews as Professor of Divinity. The March 1661 Rescissory Act returned the legal position in Scotland to that prevailing in 1633, removing the Covenanter reforms of 1638-1639. The restoration of bishops was confirmed by the Privy Council of Scotland on 6 September 1661.

Sharp was appointed Archbishop of St Andrews and Primate of Scotland and consecrated at Westminster Abbey in December 1661. The kirk was restored as the national church, independent sects banned and all office-holders were required to renounce the Covenant; about a third of the clergy refused, around 270 in total, and lost their positions as a result. Most occurred in the south-west of Scotland, an area particularly strong in its Covenanting sympathies; some took to preaching in the open fields, or conventicles, which often attracted thousands of worshippers.

After his appointment to the Privy Council of Scotland in June 1663, Sharp assumed responsibility for these evictions, making him a target for Presbyterian radicals. At the same time, his lobbying to be made Lord Chancellor brought him into conflict with Lauderdale and other political leaders. He took an active role in suppressing the Covenanter-backed Pentland Rising in November 1666; he is reported as having condemned to death eleven prisoners who surrendered on a promise of mercy, telling them "You were pardoned as soldiers, but you are not acquitted as subjects".

On 9 July 1668, James Mitchell, a veteran of Rullion Green, tried to assassinate Sharp in Edinburgh. He was seated in his coach on the Royal Mile near his house at Blackfriars Wynd waiting for Bishop Andrew Honeyman to join him. Mitchell fired his pistol at Sharp but hit Honeyman instead. Mitchell was imprisoned on the Bass Rock for this crime but was not executed until 1676.

Soon after, the government issued the first in a series of 'indulgences', allowing the readmission of evicted clergy, even without subscribing to episcopacy. The kirk split once again, this time between moderates, led by Robert Leighton, and 'hardline' Episcopalians under Sharp; over the next decade, policy alternated between persecution and reconciliation. 

In 1678, Sharp's faction regained control and supported by the government, stepped up actions against non-conformists; 3,000 Lowland militia and 6,000 Highlanders, known as the "Highland Host", were billeted in the Covenanting shires, as a form of punishment. James Mitchell, who had been arrested in 1673, was executed in 1678, making him a Presbyterian folk hero; Sharp gave evidence at his trial and was accused of perjury.

On 3 May 1679, a group of nine Covenanters, led by David Hackston and his brother-in-law, John Balfour of Kinloch, were waiting at Magus Muir, hoping to ambush the Sheriff of Cupar. A Sharp appointee, the Sheriff was prominent in persecuting Covenanters but apparently heard about the proposed ambush and stayed home. Learning Sharp's coach was on the road, they intercepted it instead; Sharp was stabbed several times, in front of his daughter Isabella, before being killed by a shot to the chest. One of the group, James Russell, claimed he told Sharp he "...declared before the Lord that it was no particular interest, nor yet for any wrong that he had done to him, but because he had betrayed the church as Judas, and had wrung his hands, these 18 or 19 years in the blood of the saints, but especially at Pentland..."

Two of the nine, Hackston and Andrew Guillan, were eventually captured and executed; a third, William Dingwall, died at the Battle of Drumclog a month later. The other six were never tried; Balfour escaped to Holland with George Fleming, but disappears from the records thereafter.

Aftermath

Sharp was buried beneath an imposing black and white marble monument in the Holy Trinity Church, St Andrews. Designed by his son, Sir William, it has two main objectives; commemorating his father as a martyr, rather than a turncoat, and confirming his privileged status as archbishop. When the tomb was opened in 1849, it was empty; the body was allegedly removed in 1725 and has never been found.

On 25 December 1679, five Covenanters captured at Bothwell Bridge, Thomas Brown, James Wood, Andrew Sword, John Weddell and John Clyde, were hanged for refusing to identify the perpetrators. Although not involved themselves, they were executed at Magus Muir; their bodies hung in chains until the flight of James VII in 1688. A gravestone was erected over their burial place in 1728 and enclosed by a surrounding wall in 1877; the same year that a memorial to Sharp was built.

19th century Scottish histories portrayed Sharp as a despised turncoat; "For well concocted, cold blooded, systematic dissimulation, he stands almost without a match in History." Even more recent writers suggest his death can be seen as deserved retribution for his actions.

His most recent biographer, Julia Buckroyd, summarised his career as follows; "Sharp, who identified himself as a Scot and Presbytery, and who struggled to extricate Scotland from the Cromwellian union,...became identified as an agent of English, episcopal and political interests...an enemy of Scottish Presbyterianism and the rule of law."

The 1688 Glorious Revolution in Scotland led to the Act of Settlement in 1690, which re-established the kirk on a Presbyterian basis. Episcopacy was abolished once and for all, leading to the formation of the separate Scottish Episcopal Church.

Family
He  was  married  on  6  April  1653  to,  Helen, daughter  of  William  Moncrieff  of  Randerston,  and  had  issue — 
Sir  William  of  Scotscraig, created  a  Baronet  1683,  died  January  1712
John,  baptised  February  1665
Isabella  (married, cont.  18  December  1679,  John  Cunningham  of  Barns)
Catherine
Margaret,  born  8  December  1664  (married  11  October  1683,  William Fraser, 12th Lord Saltoun),  died  1734
Penelope (married  John  Dubh  Mackinnon  of  that  Ilk)
Agnes,  buried  March  1666
Robert, sheriff-clerk  of  Banff.

References

Sources

External links

 
 
 

1618 births
1679 deaths
Alumni of the University of Aberdeen
Archbishops of St Andrews
Assassinated Scottish people
Chancellors of the University of St Andrews
Members of the Privy Council of Scotland
Members of the Parliament of Scotland 1661–1663
Members of the Convention of the Estates of Scotland 1665
Members of the Convention of the Estates of Scotland 1667
Members of the Parliament of Scotland 1669–1674
Members of the Convention of the Estates of Scotland 1678
People from Banffshire
Scottish Restoration bishops
17th-century bishops of the Church of Scotland